Roylance is a surname. Notable people with the surname include: 

Archie Roylance, fictional character in several novels by John Buchan (1875–1940)
Jayne Roylance (1947–2018), English lawn bowls player
Pamela Roylance (born 1952), American actress

English-language surnames